Geneviève Colot (born 22 June 1950 in Gommegnies) is a former member of the National Assembly of France.  She represented the Essonne department,  and is a member of the Union for a Popular Movement.

References

1950 births
Living people
People from Nord (French department)
Rally for the Republic politicians
Union for a Popular Movement politicians
Women members of the National Assembly (France)
Deputies of the 12th National Assembly of the French Fifth Republic
Deputies of the 13th National Assembly of the French Fifth Republic
21st-century French women politicians